Deganga is a village and a gram panchayat in the Deganga CD block in the Barasat Sadar subdivision of the North 24 Parganas district in the state of West Bengal, India. Berachampa and Deulia are located nearby.

Geography

Location

Area overview
The area covered in the map alongside is largely a part of the north Bidyadhari Plain. located in the lower Ganges Delta. The country is flat. It is a little raised above flood level and the highest ground borders the river channels. 54.67% of the people of the densely populated area lives in the urban areas and 45.33% lives in the rural  areas.

Note: The map alongside presents some of the notable locations in the subdivision. All places marked in the map are linked in the larger full screen map.

Civic administration

Police station
Deganga police station covers an area of 202.09 km2 and serves a total population of 319,213. It has jurisdiction over Deganga CD block. There is a police out post at Swetpur.

Demographics
According to the 2011 Census of India, Deganga had a total population of 3,377, of which 1,719 (51%) were males and 1,658 (49%) were females. Population in the age range 0–6 years was 342. The total number of literate perons in Deganga was 2,509 (82.67% of the population over 6 years).

Transport
State Highway 2 passes through Deganga.

Healthcare
Biswanathpur Rural Hospital at Deganga with 30 beds functions as the main medical facility in Deganga CD Block. There are primary health centres at Ajinagar (Hadipur-Jhikra PHC  with 6 beds), Chakla (Raypur Chakla PHC with 10 beds), Deganga (Kolsur PHC with 10 beds) and Kartickpur (6 beds)

See also
  Map Deganga CD Block on Page 445 of District Census Handbook.

References

Villages in North 24 Parganas district